The first Constitution of Vermont was drafted in July 1777, almost five months after Vermont declared itself an independent country, now frequently called the Vermont Republic. It was in effect until its extensive revision in 1786.  The second Constitution of Vermont went into effect in 1786 and lasted until 1793, two years after Vermont was admitted to the Union as the fourteenth state. In 1791 Vermont became the fourteenth US state and in 1793 it adopted its current constitution.

1777 Constitution 

The 1777 constitution was the first in what is now the territory of the United States to prohibit adult slavery, grant suffrage to non-landowning males, and establish free public education.

The constitution was adopted on July 8, 1777, at the tavern in Windsor now known as the Old Constitution House and administered as a state historic site. The constitution consisted of three main parts. The first was a preamble reminiscent of the United States Declaration of Independence:

It is absolutely necessary, for the welfare and safety of the inhabitants of this State, that it should be, henceforth, a free and independent State; and that a just, permanent, and proper form of government, should exist in it, derived from, and founded on, the authority of the people only, agreeable to the direction of the honorable American Congress.

(Here the term "American Congress" refers to the Continental Congress.)

Jonas Fay was a delegate to the convention; he was named chairman of the committee appointed to draft the declaration announcing the creation of the Vermont Republic, and received credit as the document's primary author.

Chapter 1 

The second part of the 1777 constitution was Chapter 1, a "Declaration of the Rights of the Inhabitants of the State of Vermont." This chapter was composed of 19 articles guaranteeing various civil and political rights in Vermont:

 The first article declared that "all men are born equally free and independent, and have certain natural, inherent and unalienable rights, amongst which are the enjoying and defending life and liberty; acquiring, possessing and protecting property, and pursuing and obtaining happiness and safety," echoing the famous phrases in the Declaration of Independence that declared that "all men are created equal" and possess "inalienable rights," including "life, liberty and the pursuit of happiness." The article went on to declare that because of these principles, "no male person, born in this country, or brought from over sea, ought to be holden by law, to serve any person, as a servant, slave or apprentice, after he arrives to the age of twenty-one Years, nor female, in like manner, after she arrives to the age of eighteen years, unless they are bound by their own consent." While this was the first such partial ban on slavery in the New World, it was not strongly enforced and slavery in the state persisted for at least another sixty years. See also History of slavery in Vermont. 
 The second article declared that "private property ought to be subservient to public uses, when necessity requires it; nevertheless, whenever any particular man's property is taken for the use of the public, the owner ought to receive an equivalent in money." This established the basic principles of eminent domain in Vermont.
 The third article established freedom of religion.
 The fourth through seventh articles subordinated the government to the interests of the people.
 The eighth article gave all freemen the right to vote (even if they owned no property).
 The ninth article said that since everyone has a right to be protected in his life, liberty, and property, that he ought to contribute his share to the expense of that protection.
 The tenth through thirteenth articles concerned due process of law.
 The fourteenth and fifteenth articles concerned freedom of speech, freedom of the press, the right to bear arms, and the subordination of the military to the civil power.
 The seventeenth article recognizes a right to emigrate.
 The eighteenth article recognizes rights of assembly and petition.
 The nineteenth article says no one should be liable to be transported from Vermont to any other place to be tried for offenses committed in Vermont.

Chapter 2 

Chapter 2 of the Constitution is called A Plan or Frame of Government.

 Sections I through IV of Chapter 2 provide that "THE COMMONWEALTH or STATE of VERMONT, shall be governed, hereafter, by a Governor, Deputy Governor, Council, and an Assembly of the Representatives of the Freemen of the same".  It vests executive power in the governor and council, and legislative power in the House of Representatives, and requires a court of justice to be established in every county.
 Section V prescribes universal military training.
 Section VI says every man at least 21 years old (even those not owning property) may vote if they take an oath promising to vote consistently with the interests of the state of Vermont. (The Vermont voter's oath is still required today for first-time voters when they register.  None of the other states require an oath of voters.)
 Sections VII through IX and XI through XVI provide for annual election of legislators and annual legislative sessions.
 Section X says the legislature is to elect delegates to the Continental Congress. (However, the Continental Congress refused to recognize the independence of Vermont and to allow it representation.)
 Sections XVII and XVIII deal with the powers of the governor and council, in particular making the governor the commander-in-chief of the military.
 Sections XXI through XXVI deal with courts of law, in particular the supreme court and the courts of common pleas.

Chapter 2 continues through 44 Sections.

1786 Constitution 

The 1786 Constitution of Vermont established a greater separation of powers than what had prevailed under the 1777 Constitution.  In particular, it forbade anyone to simultaneously hold more than one of certain offices: governor, lieutenant-governor, judge of the supreme court, treasurer of the state, member of the governor's council, member of the legislature, surveyor-general, or sheriff. It also provided that the legislature could no longer function as a court of appeals nor otherwise intervene in cases before the courts, as it had often done.

The 1786 Constitution continued in effect when, in 1791, Vermont made the transition from independence to the status of one of the states of the Union.  In particular, the governor, the members of the governor's council, and other officers of the state, including judges in all courts, simply continued their terms of office that were already underway.

1793 Constitution 

The 1793 Constitution was adopted two years after Vermont's admission to the Union and continues in effect, with various later amendments, to this day.  It eliminated all mention of grievances against King George III and against the State of New York.  In 1790, New York's legislature finally renounced its claims that Vermont was a part of New York, the cessation of those claims being effective if and when Congress decided to admit Vermont.

See also
History of Vermont
History of slavery in Vermont

References

External links 
 The Vermont State Archives text of the Vermont Republic constitution
 The Vermont State Archives text of the 1786 constitution
 The Vermont State Archives text of the 1793 constitution
 The birthplace of Vermont and its constitution
 The original constitution manuscript
 The 1777 Constitution of Vermont on the web site of the Avalon Project at Yale University

1777 in law
1793 in American law
Vermont
Pre-statehood history of Vermont
Vermont Republic
Vermont culture
Vermont law
1793 disestablishments in the United States